The Mata do Jacaré Ecological Station, formerly the São Carlos Ecological Station, is an ecological station in the state of São Paulo, Brazil. It preserves an isolated fragment of the Atlantic Forest biome, with semi-deciduous riparian vegetation.

History

This became the São Carlos Ecological Station (} by state decree 26.890 of 12 March 1987.
A 2002 federal decree said the name of a conservation unit should where possible be based on its most significant natural feature or its oldest name, so it became the Estação Ecológica Mata do Jacaré by state decree 53.237 of 20 July 2012.
It is administered by the Forestry Institute of the state environmental secretariat.

The unit lies along the south shore of the reservoir formed by the Santana Dam on the Jacaré-Guaçu River, which separates the municipalities of Brotas and São Carlos.
The area is hilly and includes steep slopes susceptible to erosion.
It drains into the  Santana reservoir.

Environment

The Mata do Jacaré has typical seasonal semi-deciduous forest vegetation of the Atlantic Forest biome, one of the last fragments of such forest in the São Carlos region.
The unit has riparian vegetation. It is an isolated fragment surrounded by sugar cane fields.
A 2002 study found only 145 species of birds, with a low incidence of endangered species. This appeared to be due to the small size and isolation of the unit.
An extension of protection around the area has been proposed both to conserve biodiversity and to maintain the water quality of the reservoir.

Notes

Sources

Ecological stations of Brazil
Protected areas of São Paulo (state)
Protected areas of the Atlantic Forest
1987 establishments in Brazil
Protected areas established in 1987